Alistair Ian Scown (born 21 October 1948) was a New Zealand rugby union player. He has five caps as an All Black. All his test appearances were in 1972.
Scown is known for being a player involved in what has been described as "the greatest try of them all" in a match between Barbarian FC and the All Blacks in 1973.

Scown's daughter Sonia has represented New Zealand in rowing, and won bronze at the 2001 World Rowing Championships. Scown's son-in-law is Rob Waddell, who won a rowing gold at the 2000 Olympics.

Scown's son Hayden is an accomplished rugby player, having played at Provincial level for Waikato, and age group New Zealand level.

Scown's youngest daughter, Amanda Merrington, is a real estate agent living in Cambridge.

References

External links
 Player profile from New Zealand national rugby union team official website

1948 births
Living people
New Zealand international rugby union players
People from Patea
New Zealand rugby union players
Taranaki rugby union players
Rugby union flankers
Rugby union players from Taranaki